First Lady of Uruguay (Spanish: Primera Dama de Uruguay) is the unofficial and protocol title of the wife of the President of Uruguay, and hostess of Suarez Residence. The first lady is not an elected position, carries no official duties and brings no salary, but is traditionally responsible for directing and coordinating activities in the social field of the presidency and also accompany the president in ceremonies or official activities. 

The current first lady is Lorena Ponce de León, wife of Luis Lacalle Pou, who took office on 1 March 2020.

List of the first ladies of Uruguay

Living former first ladies

References

Uruguay